Birstall railway station served the village of Birstall, in the historical county of West Riding of Yorkshire, England, from 1852 to 1962 on the Birstall Branch line.

History 
The station was opened on 13 September 1852 by the London and North Western Railway. It closed to passengers as a wartime economy measure on 15 April 1917 but it never reopened. Bradshaw showed that the service was suspended instead of closed. It became Birstall Lower after passenger closure. The station remained open for goods traffic until 1963. or 1962

References

External links 

Disused railway stations in West Yorkshire
Former London and North Western Railway stations
Railway stations in Great Britain opened in 1852
Railway stations in Great Britain closed in 1917
1852 establishments in England
1963 disestablishments in England
Birstall, West Yorkshire